Steven Winter is a law professor. He is the Walter S. Gibbs Professor of Constitutional Law at Wayne State University Law School. In 2017 he was promoted to distinguished professor.

Biography
Winter attended Yeshiva University and Columbia Law School. From 1986 to 1997 he taught at the University of Miami School of Law, and from 1997 to 2002 he taught at Brooklyn Law School. He began teaching at Wayne State University Law School in 2002 as the Walter S. Gibbs Professor of Constitutional Law. In 2017 he was promoted to distinguished professor.

References 

Brooklyn Law School faculty
Living people
Wayne State University faculty
Yeshiva University alumni
Columbia Law School alumni

Year of birth missing (living people)